"There's No Place I'd Rather Be" is a song sung by Singaporean artiste, Kit Chan. Along with Will you, it serves as the official theme to the National Day Parade in 2007. The single is one of the few National Day Parade themes that doesn't mention Singapore's name. The song was originally written for Singapore Polytechnic's, "Musical Superstar: The Pop Musical". It was later sung by Project SuperStar finalist, Kelly Poon before being commissioned as an official National Day Parade theme in 2007.

Music video

As with every other NDP music video, the music video is usually sponsored by a locally established company. For this short film, DBS Bank was the official sponsor.

See also
 National Day Parade
 National Day Parade, 2007
 Music of Singapore

References

External links
 NDP official website
 

Singaporean songs
2007 songs